Philip of Oxford (died after 1191) was an Augustinian canon and head of the Priory of St Frideswide, Oxford.

Philip is the author of a collection of miracles attributed to Frithuswith, The Miracles of St Frideswide (Miracula sancte Frideswide). In the work, he names himself as prior on the day of the translation of her relics, 12 February 1180.

References

Bibliography 

 
 
 

Canonical Augustinian abbots and priors
Canonical Augustinian scholars
English religious writers
12th-century Latin writers
Year of birth unknown
Year of death unknown
English male non-fiction writers
12th-century English writers